Gulf Shores High School is a high school in Gulf Shores, Alabama, United States that serves grades 9-12 and is part of Gulf Shores City Schools in Alabama. The school is at the center of a plan to build a combination high school-junior college campus which would alleviate overcrowding at the present school while providing a close link with Coastal Alabama Community College.

Gulf Shores High School's mascot is the dolphin.

History
It was a part of the Baldwin County School District until 2019, when Gulf Shores's own school district was established.
 
The school served Orange Beach and several unincorporated areas prior to the 2019 separation. For the 2019-2020 school year Orange Beach grade 7-10 students and grade 7-10 students in unincorporated areas had a choice between remaining with Gulf Shores schools or attending temporary classrooms established by Baldwin County schools. Orange Beach Middle and High School opened in 2020.

Administration
Along with Gulf Shores Elementary and Middle schools, Gulf Shores High School is now part of the Gulf Shores City Schools system following the split from the  Baldwin County school system, made official on June 3, 2019.

School principal, Cindy Veazey, was a principal previously at Wetumpka High School. Veazey was set to become principal of the Orange Beach Middle-High School in Orange Beach, Alabama; however, she was appointed back to her position following the school split.

References

Schools in Baldwin County, Alabama
Public high schools in Alabama